Victor Nizet, M.D. is a distinguished professor of pediatrics, scientist, and physician. As of 2022, he is the Vice Chair of Basic Research at the Department of Pediatrics at the University of California, San Diego (UCSD) School of Medicine. He is also a distinguished professor at UCSD Skaggs School of Pharmacy and Pharmaceutical Sciences in La Jolla, California. He is known for research in the areas of molecular microbiology and the innate immune system, with a particular focus on infectious diseases caused by common Gram-positive bacterial pathogens such as Group A Streptococcus, Group B Streptococcus and Staphylococcus aureus.

A native of Santa Barbara, California, Dr. Nizet received his undergraduate education at Reed College in Portland, Oregon, completed his MD degree at Stanford University School of Medicine, a Residency and Chief Residency in Pediatrics at Harvard University/Boston Children's Hospital, and fellowship in Pediatric Infectious Diseases at the University of Washington/Seattle Children's before joining the UCSD faculty in 1997.

Research
Nizet's publication record reveals work on molecular genetic approaches to discover and characterize bacterial virulence factors involved in host cell injury, epithelial adherence, cellular invasion, inflammation, molecular mimicry and resistance to immunologic clearance. The group focuses on the function of host phagocytic cells, such as macrophages and neutrophils, to understand the contribution of host factors such as antimicrobial peptides, leukocyte surface receptors, signal transduction pathways, and transcription factors in defense against invasive bacterial infection. Additional lines of translational research pursue therapeutic strategies for serious or antibiotic-resistant infections are pursued including neutralization of bacterial virulence phenotypes, pharmacologic augmentation of host phagocyte function, and repurposing of existing drugs for unexpected beneficial activities operating at the host-pathogen interface.

Dr. Nizet's other longstanding academic focus areas include cross-disciplinary research and educational program development, enhancing graduate and postdoctoral training in biological, medical and pharmaceutical sciences, junior faculty development, encouragement of academic-industry collaborations, and public engagement in the sciences.

References

External links
 
E. Mead Johnson Award for Research in Pediatrics

Living people
American microbiologists
Reed College alumni
Stanford University School of Medicine alumni
University of California, San Diego faculty
People from Santa Barbara, California
Year of birth missing (living people)